Bill Adams was an American football coach.  He served as the head football coach at Arkansas State College—now known as Arkansas State University—from 1939 to 1941, compiling a record of 5–14–2.  Adams attended Arkansas State, where he played college football as a quarterback from 1935 to 1936.  He was an assistant football coach at Walnut Ridge High School in  Walnut Ridge, Arkansas prior to be hired as the head football coach at his alma mater in May 1939.

Head coaching record

References

Further reading
 Staff (May 26, 1939). "Bill Adams Steps Up". The Enterprise Ledger. Page 1.
 Staff (February 22, 1945). "Post Athletic Officer Moved". The Blytheville Courier News. Page 8.
 Staff (March 26, 1948). "Capt. Bill Adams On Special Assignment Springfield, Mass.". The Enterprise Ledger. Page 1.
 Staff (September 16, 1949). "Capt. Bill Adams Is Stationed in Japan". The Enterprise Ledger. Page 12.
 Mosely, Max (August 7, 1951). "The Grandstand; By Mail". The Montgomery Advertiser. Page 11.

Year of birth missing
Year of death missing
American football quarterbacks
Arkansas State Red Wolves football coaches
Arkansas State Red Wolves football players